The Battle of the Sexes is a 1959 British black and white comedy film starring Peter Sellers, Robert Morley, and Constance Cummings, and directed by Charles Crichton. Based on the short story "The Catbird Seat" by James Thurber, it was adapted by Monja Danischewsky. A timid accountant in a Scottish Tweed weaving company cleverly bests a brash modern American efficiency expert whose ideas threaten his way of life.

Plot
Martin, the accountant for a Scottish Tweed weaving company, is in Edinburgh buying whisky and cigarettes on the Royal Mile. Martin is called to the death-bed of the owner, old MacPherson, at Moray Place. MacPherson offers him a whisky but Martin declines, so MacPherson drinks the two and promptly dies.

The new owner of the Tweed company, the young MacPherson, is enamoured of a zealous American woman who is an efficiency expert and who wants to turn her hand to revolutionise the very traditional company. She insists on visiting "the factory" on the Hebrides islands, only to discover the task is done by old couples, on crofts where they spin the wool. She plans to replace the 700 weavers, dotted across the islands, with a single large factory. Whilst being driven through the city, she also says the company should change to synthetic fibres, causing the chauffeur to drive into the back of a brewer's dray.

Martin watches a Sherlock Holmes film at the cinema and is inspired to kill Mrs Barrows. As he is a non-smoker and a non-drinker, he decides he can mislead any future investigation by smoking and drinking at the scene of the planned crime. He buys a half-bottle of whisky and a packet of cigarettes. However, in her flat, after a series of botched attempts, his conscience gets the better of him and he cannot kill her. He tries to remove all evidence when MacPherson appears suddenly, and manages to avoid detection. Back in the office, MacPherson interrogates Martin and finds his denial more plausible than Mrs Barrows' claims. She cannot take any more, accusing them all of being mad, and she leaves for good. Thus, Mr. Martin wins his "battle of the sexes". Later, seeing her crying at the station, he is moved to buy her a flower.

Cast
 Peter Sellers as Mr. Martin
 Robert Morley as Robert MacPherson
 Constance Cummings as Angela Barrows
 Jameson Clark as Andrew Darling
 Ernest Thesiger as Old Macpherson
 Donald Pleasence as Irwin Hoffman
 Moultrie Kelsall as Graham
 Alex Mackenzie as Robertson
 Roddy McMillan as Macleod
 Michael Goodliffe as Detective (on film in cinema)
 Noel Howlett as Mr. White
 Abe Barker as Mr Meekie
 William Mervyn as Detective's friend (on film in cinema)
 Patricia Hayes as Jeannie Macdougall
 Fred Griffiths as railway porter
 Glyn Houston as railway porter

Production
Film rights to the story were owned by Hecht Hill Lancaster. Billy Wilder was signed to direct. Then Charles Crichton was brought out from London to direct the film but it didn't proceed. Eventually they sold the rights.

It was the first film made by the newly-formed Bryanston Films, who approved it on 13 May 1959. Crichton liked the script, felt Robert Morley was "slightly miscast... but I think it was about the best performance Peter Sellars ever gave in his life."

Reception

Box Office
The film was a minor box office hit earning Bryanston a profit of £10,894. Kine Weekly called it a "money maker" at the British box office.

Critical
On its 1960 release, the film was very warmly reviewed by The New York Times, with critic A. H. Weiler calling it a "gentle, tongue-in-cheek ribbing that cleaves to the spirit, if not entirely to the letter of Thurber's lampoon."

References

External links
 
 

1959 films
British comedy films
1959 comedy films
British black-and-white films
Films directed by Charles Crichton
Films set in Scotland
Films based on short fiction
Films based on works by James Thurber
Films shot in Edinburgh
1960s English-language films
1950s English-language films
1950s British films
1960s British films